"My Toot Toot" also popularly known as "Don't Mess with My Toot Toot" or "(Don't Mess with) My Toot Toot" is a song written by Sidney Simien and performed by him under his stage name Rockin' Sidney. Simien wrote the song and released it on the Maison de Soul Records label in Ville Platte, Louisiana.  In October 1984, he included the tune on his third album, My Zydeco Shoes Got the Zydeco Blues, recording the entire album at his home studio in Lake Charles and playing all the instruments himself.

Content and history
In January 1985, "My Toot Toot" was released as a single in Louisiana and Texas and became Rockin' Sidney's first true regional hit. Thanks to Cleon Floyd, manager of R&B singer and uncle to King Floyd, it became a huge New Orleans hit. Floyd first heard the crowd's reaction to the song at a bill headlined by Solomon Burke. Cleon was also the president of the Orleans Street Jocks Association and took twenty copies of the record back to the city; he quickly had to order more. By Mardi Gras, it was a jukebox and record hop smash.

Huey Meaux got the original leased to Epic Records, who released it nationally,  and for a brief moment Rockin' Sidney made musical history. Epic managed to get Rockin' Sidney into the country Top 40 where it stayed for 18 weeks. It was the first zydeco song to receive major airplay on pop, rock and country radio stations. Later in 1985, "My Toot-Toot" was certified platinum and won the 1986 Grammy Award for Best Ethnic or Traditional Folk Recording.

As a result, Sidney was featured in People magazine, Rolling Stone, Billboard and Music City News and appeared on many national TV shows, including Nashville Now, Church Street Station, Hee Haw, Austin City Limits, John Fogerty's Showtime Special, New Country and Charlie Daniels Jam. He was also a guest celebrity on You Can Be a Star.

Covers
"My Toot Toot" has been covered by many artists including Fats Domino and Doug Kershaw, Rosie Ledet, Jean Knight, Terrance Simien, Denise LaSalle, Jimmy C. Newman, John Fogerty and Jello Biafra. Other versions include Louisiana Zydeco accordionist and singer Fernest Arceneaux, British-Jamaican television personality Rustie Lee, Swedish dansband Lasse Stefanz and Irish country singer Mike Denver.

Denise LaSalle's version was a hit in the UK, peaking at number six in 1985 and number 76 in Australia.

Other-language covers
A Spanish version by La Sonora Dinamita titled "Mi Cucu" sold over a million copies in Mexico, Central America, and South America. A German beer company licensed the song to use in their radio and television commercials. The German cover version "Mein Tuut Tuut" by Leinemann reached number 15 on the West German chart in 1985.

Charts

Weekly charts

Rockin' Sidney version

Jean Knight version

Denise LaSalle version
{|class="wikitable sortable plainrowheaders" style="text-align:center"
!Chart (1985)
!Peakposition
|-
!scope="row"|Australia (Kent Music Report)
|76
|-

|-

|-
!scope="row"|Europe (European Top 100 Singles)
|17
|-

|-

|-

|-

|-

|-
!scope="row"|US Hot Black Singles (Billboard){{small|Charted as "My Tu-Tu"}}
|79
|-

|}

"Mein Tuut Tuut"

Year-end charts
Denise LaSalle version

"Mein Tuut Tuut"

In popular culture
"My Toot Toot" has been used in soundtracks of the motion pictures Hard Luck, One Good Cop and The Big Easy.

Over 20 years after "My Toot Toot" debuted, it continued to draw royalties from commercial use in Europe, and cover versions in several languages by dozens of musicians.

In 2013, Melissa McCarthy parodied the song in an episode of Saturday Night Live. Playing "Casey Patterson", a contestant on The Voice'' looking to leave her career replacing trailer hitches on U-Hauls, and to move from the "basement without the roof", which Jason Sudeikis' character Blake Shelton described as "a hole".

References

1984 songs
1985 singles
Rockin' Sidney songs
Denise LaSalle songs
Epic Records singles